Watch Your Wife is a 1926 American silent comedy-drama film directed by Svend Gade and starring Virginia Valli, Pat O'Malley and Nat Carr.

Cast
 Virginia Valli as Claudia Langham 
 Pat O'Malley as James Langham 
 Nat Carr as Benjamin Harris 
 Helen Lee Worthing as Gladys Moon 
 Albert Conti as Alphonse Marsac 
 Aggie Herring as Madame Buff 
 Nora Hayden as Maid 
 Gary Cooper as Extra

References

Bibliography
 Langman, Larry. Destination Hollywood: The Influence of Europeans on American Filmmaking. McFarland, 2000.

External links

1926 films
1926 comedy-drama films
American silent feature films
1920s English-language films
Universal Pictures films
Films directed by Svend Gade
American black-and-white films
1920s American films
Silent American comedy-drama films